Last Date is a live Emmylou Harris album, released in October 1982.  Recorded at a series of honky tonks and other small venues on the west coast, Harris conceived the album as a showcase for her Hot Band.  It was composed mostly of country standards.  Harris reached No. 1 on the U.S. country charts with the title single, written by Floyd Cramer, who originally took it to the top ten on the U.S. pop and country charts, as an instrumental in 1960.  In 2000, Eminent Records reissued Last Date for the first time on CD, complete with new liner notes and two bonus tracks.

Track listing

Personnel
Emmylou Harris - Vocals, Acoustic Guitar, Lead Guitar (12)
Mike Bowden - Bass
Steve Fishell - Pedal Steel, Dobro
Wayne Goodwin - Rhythm Guitar, Fiddle, Mandolin, Sax
Don Johnson - Keyboards, Harmony Vocals
Frank Reckard - Lead Guitar, Harmony Vocals
Barry Tashian - Rhythm Guitar, Banjo, Duet Vocals
John Ware - Drums

Technical personnel
Brian Ahern - Producer
Donivan Cowart, Stuart Taylor, Alan Vachon - Engineer

Charts

Weekly charts

Year-end charts

References
 Emmylou Harris Last Date liner notes

Emmylou Harris live albums
1982 live albums
Albums produced by Brian Ahern (producer)
Warner Records live albums